The Honda N360 is a small front-engine, front-wheel drive, two-door, four-passenger car manufactured and marketed by Honda from March 1967 through 1970 in Japan's highly regulated kei class — as both a two-door sedan and three-door wagon.

After a January 1970 facelift, the N360 became the NIII360 and continued in production until June 1972. A larger-engined variant, the N600, was marketed through 1973. All models used a straight forward two-box design that complied with kei dimensional regulations — though vehicles with the 401 cc and 598 cc engines exceeded the kei engine displacement limits and were largely intended for markets outside Japan.

The N360 featured front wheel drive and an air-cooled, four-stroke, 354 cc,  two-cylinder engine. This same engine was used in the Honda Vamos, with a beam axle/leaf spring rear suspension.

The simple N360 name, along with its variants, used the "N" prefix, which stood for norimono and translated from Japanese to English as vehicle (or car) —  distinguishing the cars from the company's motorcycle offerings.

In 2012, Honda introduced the Honda N-One, an homage inspired by the 1967–1973 N sedans.

Versions

Honda marketed the N360 as a two-door sedan, with a three-door wagon (considered a commercial vehicle in Japan, and therefore called a "Light van") called the LN360 arriving in June of the first year. It has a horizontally divided rear gate and boxier rear bodywork for maximum load capacity. After a January 1970 facelift it became the LNIII 360, with a new non-reflective dash, bigger turn signals, and the same new front end as the sedan. The LNIII 360 was built until late 1971, when the Life Van took over.

The N360 was an all new, clean-sheet product, and did not share its chassis with the Honda Sports roadster, or the Honda L700 commercial platform. The N360 was a new market segment for Honda, providing an affordable, reliable, and easy-to-maintain vehicle that had broad market appeal to private car ownership. The roadsters and trucks built up to then had specific, targeted appeal.

The engine's technological specifications reflected engineering efforts resulting from the development of the larger Honda 1300, which used an air-cooled 1.3-litre engine. One of the primary differences between the N360 and the Honda Life that followed was the N360/600 had an air-cooled engine, and the Life had a water-cooled engine. The water-cooled engine was better able to comply with newly enacted emission standards in Japan, and reflected an industry wide move away from air-cooled as well as two-stroke engines. As does the original Mini, but unlike the succeeding Life, the N360/600 had its gearbox mounted in the sump rather than bolted on as a separate unit. The N360E engine was unusual in several ways: its two cylinders sat rather far apart, with the cam chain running between them. Unlike most air-cooled automobile engine, it does not use an oil cooler. The two pistons travel together, eliminating the need for a distributor but making for additional vibrations.

An upgraded  engine was added in October 1968 for the N360 TS, which was sold as the N360 Touring following a minor update in January 1969. The updated version is referred to as the NII. A 401.54 cc engine was used in the similar N400, a model sold in certain export markets beginning in late summer 1968. This occupied the narrow slot between the 360 and the 600; in most markets where it was available it was only sold as the N400 L with better equipment. The Hondamatic-equipped N360AT which appeared in August 1968 was the first kei car equipped with an automatic transmission.

N600
The larger-engined N600 was developed alongside the N360 in order to target export markets like the US and Europe, where motorways demanded higher top speeds. It was also briefly sold in the domestic Japanese market, however, where it went on sale in July 1968 as the N600E. Only 1,500 examples were sold until early 1969 when the N600 was discontinued in Japan; because of its larger engine it did not qualify for any of the tax and insurance breaks given to kei cars even though it was as small as one.

Just seven months after road testing the N360, Britain's Motor magazine tested a Honda N600 in November 1968. The test car was priced in the UK at £589 including taxes, at a time when the Mini 850 was retailing for £561. The testers were impressed to find 1100 cc performance from a 600 cc car, but found it 'very noisy when extended'. They found the Honda as easy to drive and park, and 'quite well equipped'. The performance figures put the car at or near the top of its class under most criteria, reflecting its favourable power-to-weight ratio. Consistent with its slower performance, the N360 squeezed 3 extra miles out of a (UK) gallon of fuel, managing an overall .

The N600 was introduced to the United States as the 600 Sedan in 1969 as a 1970 model, and was the first Honda automobile to be officially exported to the United States by the Honda Motor Company (a small number of sports cars had been imported privately in years prior). Sales were originally limited to Hawaii, but cars were soon exported to the US West Coast by 1970. It was technologically advanced for its time, with an all alloy engine that could achieve 9000 rpm. Engine output was 36–45 hp (27–34 kW) and was capable of propelling the car to a top speed of 81 mph (130 km/h). The lower-powered engine arrived in 1972; with milder cams and lowered compression it gave up some peak power and torque, while allowing for a less peaky delivery and higher drivability. It delivered surprisingly peppy performance because of its light weight (around 550 kg/1100 pounds), due to compact dimensions and some plastic parts (like the boot lid). The brakes on early models were very weak, despite having front discs and servo assistance. Rear suspension was a dead axle on leaf springs.

The N600 (along with the TN360 kei truck), were the first Honda cars to be assembled outside Japan, with production in Taiwan by local joint venture Sanyang Industrial beginning in 1969. The N600 was called the Fu Gui, meaning 'Wealth' in Chinese (富貴).

US sales stopped in 1972, as did those of the sportier Honda Z600 (or Z, depending on country), after about 25,000 sales of the N600. 40,550 Zs and Ns were sold altogether in the United States. The first-generation Honda Civic replaced the N models.

Serial Number N600-1000001

In September 1967, Honda offered their first automobile for the North American market, and they were exported to Los Angeles, California. 50 pre-production left-hand-drive examples were sent as "winter test vehicles" and were only intended to be driven  for endurance testing, then collected and crushed at a local scrapyard across the street from the American Honda 1960s headquarters building at 100 West Alondra Boulevard. Four of the American pre-production vehicles still exist, and Serial Number N600-1000001, the first one manufactured, was discovered at a Japanese-specific car show in Long Beach, California, in 2015. At the request of American Honda, the car was extensively restored and unveiled at the same car show one year later, to be added to the American Honda Museum collection. As of 2018 the car has been added to the Petersen Automotive Museum collection. Honda documented the restoration in a series of videos:  here and  "Serial One restoration".

Legacy
Honda has paid tribute to the N360 with a number of modern vehicles, including:
Honda EV-N concept, shown at Tokyo Motor Show 2009
Honda N-One, introduced in 2012 as a modern kei-car homage to the N360

References

External links

 ThisOldHonda.org N360
 ThisOldHonda.org N600
 HondaN600.net
  Gainesville Sun 7 May 1982 
 Ocala Star Banner 7 October 1982
 Sarasota Herald Tribune 10 June 1979
 The Honda N600E - The Little Car That Opened the Roadway in America

N360
Kei cars
Cars introduced in 1967
Cars introduced in 1970
Cars powered by 2-cylinder engines
Cars discontinued in 1972